Vellimoonga is a 2014 Indian Malayalam-language political satire film directed by Jibu Jacob and written by Joji Thomas. It stars Biju Menon in the lead role with Aju Varghese, Nikki Galrani, Tini Tom, K. P. A. C. Lalitha, Sasi Kalinga, Saju Navodaya, Kalabhavan Shajon, Veena Nair, and Siddique in supporting roles. Asif Ali appears in a cameo role. The music was composed by Bijibal.

The film was released on 25 September 2014 in 60 centres across Kerala. The movie was remade in Tamil in 2016 as Muthina Kathirika.

Plot 
Mamachan is an unmarried politician who is in his 40s. Mamachan works in a relatively unknown party based in North India that barely has any presence in Kerala. He is subject to taunts and retorts due to this though he is the national leader of the party he belongs to.

Well known for his cunning and slimy tactics Mamachan has his share of haters in the village Karthikapuram, Udayagiri panchayath , Kannur. Mamachan eventually decides to get married and visits a prospective bride, only to be chased away by the bride's father as Mamachan and the bride’s mother were classmates and friends while in their teens.

Mamachan in an attempt to get serious in life decides to progress in his political career after he is taunted for being a good-for-nothing lazing around in a party without any scope or future. Mamachan visits Delhi and is given instructions to stand in elections with the understanding that if he loses his election deposit in Kerala he will be elevated to a role in the center which is viewed with jealousy by his colleague Gopi.

Gopi decides it’s better to let Mamachan win in Erikkur election, Kannur Kerala and stay as an MLA rather than losing and moving to Delhi for a better role. Gopi subsequently rallies all of Mamachan’s rivals together to work for Mamachan's victory so that they can prevent him from going to Delhi resulting in Mamachan's victory in polls. Only after elections, it’s revealed everything was Mamachan's plans to win elections as an MLA making others work for his victory and there was nothing in Delhi.

Mamachans prospective bride’s alliance is fixed with a guy from Mumbai named Charlie, who disappears on the day of the wedding. To save the bride and her family’s honor Mamachan is requested by the village elders and priest to marry her. After the marriage, Charlie appears and reveals he was Mamachans friend and his disappearance was a part of a plan by Mamachan to marry her.

Both are shown to be happily married and moving on after that.

The story of vellimoonga resembles real life characters from udayagiri Gramapanchayth in Kannur district. The story is based on some real life observations which written by JoJi Thomas who is a Native to karthikapuram.

Cast 

 Biju Menon as Maamachan C.P
 Asif Ali as Charlie/Jose Kutty Pala
 Aju Varghese as Tony Vakkathanam/Paachan
 Nikki Galrani as Lisa Wareed
 Tini Tom as V.P Jose
 K. P. A. C. Lalitha as Annakutty Cheriyan Poulowmattam
 Siddique as Kunnel Wareed
 Lena as Mollykutty Wareed
 Veena Nair as Sholi Mathew, Panchayat President
 Sunil Sukhada as Father
 Saju Navodaya as Mathew
 Sasi Kalinga
 Kalabhavan Shajon as Gopi
 Dr.Midhula Sebastian as Manju Pappan
 Anu Joseph as Sally Cheriyan .P
 Basil as Tom Cheriyan
 Geetha Salam as K.P Joseph
 Chembil Ashokan as Maniyanikutti
 Shivaji Guruvayoor as Communist Party leader
 Baby Rachael as Little Girl

Reception 
Vellimoonga received positive reviews upon release. Nowrunning.com gave 4.5/5 and called it a  "surprise winner".

Sify reported that Vellimoonga had a good opening and called the film an "instant hit". It also earned  from satellite rights.

The film won the Kerala Film Critics Association Award for Best Popular Film in 2014. Tini Tom won the Asianet Film Award for Best Supporting Actor for this film in 2014.

The film was remade in Tamil as Muthina Kathirika by Sundar C.

Soundtrack

References 

2014 films
Indian political satire films
Malayalam films remade in other languages
2010s Malayalam-language films
2010s political satire films